Carnedd Llechwedd-llyfn is a subsidiary summit of Carnedd y Filiast on the border of Snowdonia National Park in Llandderfel, in Gwynedd.   The northern slopes of the peak lie in Ysbyty Ifan, in Conwy.  It is part of the Arenig mountain range, and rises from the shore of Llyn Celyn.

It is also a peak in an area of moorland known as the Migneint. The views of northern Snowdonia are extensive. Arenig Fach, Arenig Fawr and Waun Garnedd y Filiast can also be seen.  The summit is marked by a small cairn next to a fence which runs across this boggy summit.

References

Mountains and hills of Conwy County Borough
Mountains and hills of Gwynedd
Mountains and hills of Snowdonia
Hewitts of Wales
Nuttalls
Llandderfel
Ysbyty Ifan